Muhammad bin Abdul Karim Issa (born 9 June 1965) is a Saudi Arabian politician, Secretary General of the Muslim World League, President of the International Islamic Halal Organization, and former Saudi Minister of Justice.

He also serves as the chairman of the Centre for Responsible Leadership, a body of globally influential government, faith, media, business, and community leaders working together to solve the challenges facing humanity and the world today.     

Al-Issa is considered a leading global voice on moderate Islam as well as a key figure in the fight against extremist ideology. Religious leaders and government officials alike have commended Al-Issa for his efforts to promote moderation, and cooperation and coexistence among all people.

Cardinal Timothy M. Dolan, Archbishop of New York and an influential member of the Roman Catholic Church in the United States, referred to Al-Issa as the "most eloquent spokesperson in the Islamic world for reconciliation and friendship among the religions of the world." In a historic meeting with the Church of Jesus Christ of Latter-day Saints, President Russell Nelson stated to Al-Issa, “You are a peacemaker. You are a bridge builder. And we need more leaders like you.” The American Jewish Committee has called Al-Issa “the most powerful voice in the Muslim world promoting moderate Islam.” Elan Carr, former U.S. Special Envoy to Monitor and Combat Anti-Semitism, said Al-Issa "has chosen a future of tolerance and affection, where Jews and Christians can be embraced by their Muslim brethren.”

Ndileka Mandela, granddaughter of Noble laureate Nelson Mandela and head of the Thembekile Mandela Foundation, has praised Dr Al-Issa as a "remarkable voice for Muslim tolerance and moderation".

Early life and education
Al-Issa was born in Riyadh on June 10, 1965. He obtained a bachelor of arts degree in Comparative Islamic Jurisprudence (Fiqh) at Imam Muhammad Ibn Saud Islamic University. Later, he received a master's degree and then a PhD degree in Comparative Judicial Studies as well as in Studies in General Law and Constitutional Law from the university’s higher institute of the judiciary.

Career
After graduation, Al-Issa began to work at Imam Mohammed Ibn Saud Islamic University as a faculty member. He became vice president to the board of grievances (a legal body for arbitration) in 2007, and he served there until 2009. 

On February 14, 2009, he was appointed the Minister of Justice in the Saudi cabinet, replacing Abdullah bin Muhammad Al Sheikhwho had been in office since 1992. The appointment of Al-Issa as the minister of justice was part of King Abdullah's reforms' initiatives.

As the justice minister, Al-Issa oversaw key reforms in several areas, including legislative reforms in family matters, humanitarian cases, and for the rights of women.

Following Al-Issa's departure from the Board of Grievance, executions in the kingdom grew from 69 in 2010 to 158 in 2015.  Saudi courts are affiliated with the Board of Grievances (An independent body affiliated with the King) and do not belong to the Ministry of Justice [111].

Al-Issa was appointed Secretary General of the Muslim World League on August 4, 2016.

Views
Issa argued in a lecture at Imam Muhammad bin Saud Islamic University in Riyadh in 2012 that Salafism was only an approach and that it should not be viewed as Islam. He further emphasized that the Salafi approach was moderate and meant following and obeying the ancestors’ belief and values in regard to the understanding of Islam.

Issa acknowledges the horror of the Holocaust and denounced the efforts of Holocaust denial. He advocates for Muslim immigrants to Western countries to integrate socially, in contrast to Wahhabi ideology. 

In January 2020, he led a delegation to the Auschwitz concentration camp in Poland, to mark the 75th anniversary of the camp's liberation from Nazis. In a speech on how Muslims and Jews can work together, Al-Issa stated that the Muslim World League is proud to stand “shoulder to shoulder” with the Jewish community to build better understanding, respect and harmony.

In February 2020, Dr Al-Issa led a delegation of Islamic scholars to visit Srebrenica in Bosnia to pay respect at the Srebrenica-Potocari Genocide Memorial Centre. 

Issa is opposed to Political Islam, saying that it does not reflect the true values of Islam and prevents assimilation of Muslims living in non-Muslim countries.

Honors

Hajj sermon, 2022 
In July 2022, the custodian of the Custodian of the Two Holy Mosques King Salman bin Abdulaziz Al Saud appointed Dr Al-Issa the Khateeb of Hajj 1443 Hijri to deliver the hajj sermon from the pulpit of Masjid Nimra. The Hajj is the largest gathering of Muslims in the world and Dr Al-Issa used the opportunity to advocate a moderate message of Islam promoting harmony and compassion.

He called on Muslims to avoid all that leads to "dissent, animosity, or division" and stressed that "our interactions are dominated by harmony and compassion”. His address further asked Muslims "not to give any mind to those who are insolent, have ulterior motives, or seek to obstruct him" in a bid to promote tolerance and understanding. Dr Al-Issa underscored that Islam had an encompassing spirit whose goodness extended to all of humanity

Initiatives

Auschwitz visit 

As the head of the MWL and a key Muslim voice for interfaith peace and coexistence, Dr Al-Issa collaborated with the American Jewish Committee (AJC) to lead an historic delegation of senior Muslim scholars and leaders to the Auschwitz concentration camp in January 2020. The delegation consisted of 62 Muslims, including 25 prominent religious leaders, from 28 countries. 

The visit aimed at condemning the atrocities carried out against the Jews during the World War II and expressing solidarity in standing against oppressors. AJC CEO David Harris said Dr Al-Issa's visit was the “most senior Islamic leadership delegation to ever visit Auschwitz or any Nazi German death camp”. Harris called the visit a "direct rebuttal to the extremists who threaten us all".   

Dr Al-Issa led a similar delegation to the Auschwitz-Birkenau State Museum again in January 2022.

Forum on Common Values among Religious Followers 

Under Dr Al-Issa's guidance, MWL arranged a discussion and debate forum in Riyadh in May 2022 titled "Forum on Common Values among Religious Followers" that brought together senior Muslim scholars and leaders as well as leadership and scholars of other religions from across the world.

The forum was a key initiative in bringing leadership and followers of various religions together to discuss, appreciate and promote values that bind all religions. Combining common religious principles and international conventions, the forum issued a declaration of “Common Human Values” wherein participants agreed to affirm the centrality of religion in every civilization due to its influence in “shaping the ideas of human societies”.

The participants shunned denounced the idea of an 'inevitable clash of civilizations' due to religious issues. The forum underscored that attempts to gain religious, cultural, political and economic advantages without respect for rights or ethics, and through forms of extremism, arrogance and racism, must be opposed. One of the key successes of the forum was religious leaders agreeing that it was uncalled for to link religion and malpractices of some of its followers, and that religion must not be employed for worldly purposes. 

The event was hailed as a landmark gathering of religious leadership from around the world and crucial to scaling efforts for peacebuilding and interfaith harmony. It was also cited as an effective initiative for engaging conflict parties, addressing grievances, and promote understanding on both sides of the political and religious divides.

Forum of Iraqi References 
Dr Al-Issa was also instrumental in arranging an historic gathering of Iraqi religious leadership in the holy city of Makkah that aimed at promoting greater understanding and initiating comprehensive dialogue between the differing adherents of Islam. Named "Forum of Iraqi References", the August 2021 event focused on discussing and developing frameworks on the roles of scholars in combatting sectarianism and religious extremism, promoting intra-faith coexistence, and providing support to Iraqi government efforts to achieve a lasting peace. At the end of the conference, participants agreed to denounce sectarianism and urged coexistence, moderation, mutual respect and tolerance. They also called for “opening constructive dialogue channels” among the clerics to deal with various issues.

Conference on the Declaration of Peace in Afghanistan 
In June 2021, Dr Al-Issa and the Muslim World League spearheaded a meeting of religious and political leadership from Afghanistan and Pakistan in the holy city of Makkah that devised a roadmap for attaining lasting peace in the war-torn country.  

Following a full-day conference, an accord was signed that defined religious parameters to achieve a just and comprehensive peace and reconciliation process in Afghanistan in line with Islamic principles.

Noor-ul-Haq Qadri, then federal Minister for Religious Affairs and Inter-faith Harmony in Pakistan, and Mohammad Qasim Halimi, then minister of Hajj and Religious Affairs of Afghanistan, signed the agreement.

Dr Al-Issa had said that the conference had highlighted the strong resolve "of our brothers in the meeting to advance peace in Afghanistan".

The Charter of Makkah 
The Charter of Makkah, endorsed in May 2019, was an effort led by the Muslim World League under Dr Al-Issa. The Charter was formulated to create a pan-Islamic set of principles that support anti-extremism, religious and cultural diversity, tolerance and legislation against hate and violence.

The document was declared at the end of the four-day conference organized by the Muslim World League in Makkah. It was approved by Islamic leaders of 139 countries and signed by around 1,200 prominent Muslim figures.

At the conference, more than 1,000 religious scholars representing 128 countries discussed ways to come up with a comprehensive plan to address sectarianism and extremism within Islam, and stressed the need to create effective channels of communication between the different schools of Islam.

Faith For Our Planet 

Early in 2022, Dr Al-Issa laid the foundation of Faith For Our Planet,  a global inter-faith coalition of environmentalists, religious leaders bureaucrats, politicians, and researchers. FFOP's aim is to mobilize the influence of faith and faith leaders to address the increasing threat to the planet posed by climate change. In FFOP, Dr Al-Issa envisions providing the world with an influential platform where faiths, faith leaders and faith communities can come together to find ways for climate change mitigation and for preservation of our planet. 

In this regard, FFOP began a series of workshops in June 2022, with the first workshop - Pakistan: United for Shared Responsibility - being held in Islamabad on June13 and 14 in collaboration with Iqbal International Institute of Research and Dialogue at IIUI, RSPN, and ifees.ecoislam .  The agenda of the workshop attended by leading clerics, academics and community welfare leaders from across Pakistan was to analyze the effects on environment already caused by climate change and discuss how faith could play an instrumental role in environmental preservation and climate change reversal. 

The workshop was followed by a youth workshop that trained youngsters on how they could play a concrete role in environment preservation and the ways they could create community-wide awareness about the perils of climate degradation.

Awards and recognitions 
Since taking over the Muslim World League in 2016, Dr. Al-Issa has received a number of awards and recognitions from a wide range of prominent international institutions and government officials.

 October 2020: The Royal Islamic Strategic Studies Centre named Al-Issa one of the most influential Muslims globally in its 2020 edition of “The Muslim 500: The World’s Most Influential Muslims.”
 June 2020: Dr. Al-Issa received the inaugural Combat Anti-Semitism Award from the Combat Anti-Semitism Movement and the American Sephardi Federation for his contributions to the fight against anti-Semitism and racism.
August 2019: Dr. Al-Issa was awarded the “Children of Abraham” Award alongside the head of the Foundation for Ethnic Understanding, Rabbi Marc Schneier by the Florence School of Advanced Studies for Interreligious and Intercultural Dialogue at the 40th annual Rimini Meeting.
 July 2019: Senegal's President Macky Sall awarded Dr. Al-Issa the Grand Order of the State in recognition of his efforts to promote religious understanding and harmony, and humanitarian programs around the world.
 February 2019: Dr. Al-Issa received the World’s Religions Peace Award from the National Council on US-Arab Relations for his international efforts to promote interfaith peace and harmony.
 November 2018: Dr. Al-Issa received the 2018 Moderation Prize from Makkah Governor Prince Khaled Al-Faisal for his efforts to combat extremist and terrorist ideology and promote moderation and peace.
 July 2018: Dr. Al-Issa received the 2018 Galileo International Award from the Galileo Foundation in Florence, Italy for his international achievements and leadership in promoting religious and cultural unity.

References

1965 births
Living people
Imam Muhammad ibn Saud Islamic University alumni
Academic staff of Imam Muhammad ibn Saud Islamic University
Justice ministers of Saudi Arabia
Muslim reformers
Saudi Arabian Sunni Muslim scholars of Islam